The Naked Truth is a 1957 British black comedy film starring Terry-Thomas, Peter Sellers and Dennis Price. Peggy Mount, Shirley Eaton and Joan Sims also appear. It was produced and directed by Mario Zampi from a screenplay by Michael Pertwee. It was released in the U.S. as Your Past Is Showing.

Plot
Nigel Dennis is a blackmailer who threatens to publish embarrassing secrets in his magazine The Naked Truth. After attempting to blackmail a famous scientist (who commits suicide), and an MP (who suffers a heart attack in parliament, and probably succumbs), his latest targets are Lord Henry Mayley, television host Sonny MacGregor, writer Flora Ransom, and model Melissa Right. Several of them decide independently that murder would be a better solution than paying. However, it is Mayley who by sheer bad luck nearly ends up the victim of both MacGregor and Ransom's schemes. The four eventually join forces and try again. That attempt also fails, but Dennis is then arrested for an earlier crime.

When Dennis threatens to reveal all at his trial, Mayley comes up with a scheme to break him out of prison and send him to South America, with the help of hundreds of his other victims. They phone in numerous fake calls for help, distracting the London police, while Mayley, MacGregor, and MacGregor's reluctant assistant Porter, disguised as policemen, whisk Dennis away.

Knocking Dennis unconscious periodically, they finally end up in the cabin of a blimp on the way to a rendezvous with an outbound ship. To their dismay, when he comes to, Dennis refuses to go along with their plan, as he in fact never wanted to reveal any of their secrets in court. He was, in fact, optimistic about the trial anyway, and reveals that the evidence was his copies of "The Naked Truth" which had been destroyed by the plotters earlier. Happy to have outsmarted his opponents again, but unaware of where he is, Dennis then steps out for some air and plummets to the ocean below. When MacGregor celebrates by shooting his pistol, it punctures the blimp, which shoots away into the distance.

Cast
 Terry-Thomas as Lord Henry Mayley
 Peter Sellers as Sonny MacGregor
 Peggy Mount as Flora Ransom
 Shirley Eaton as Melissa Right
 Dennis Price as Nigel Dennis
 Georgina Cookson as Lady Lucy Mayley, Henry's wife
 Joan Sims as Ethel Ransom, Flora's daughter and reluctant accomplice
 Miles Malleson as Reverend Cedric Bastable, Flora's fiancé
 Kenneth Griffith as Porter
 Moultrie Kelsall as Mactavish
 Bill Edwards as Bill Murphy, Melissa's rich Texan boyfriend
 Wally Patch as Fred - paunchy old man
 Henry Hewitt as Gunsmith
 John Stuart as Police Inspector
 David Lodge as Constable Johnson
 Joan Hurley as Authoress
 Peter Noble as Television Announcer
 Victor Rietti as Doctor
 Wilfrid Lawson as TV Contestant
 Ronald Adam as Chemist
 Michael Ripper as Greengrocer

Critical reception
According to Allmovie, the film is: "A prescient satire of tabloid journalists and celebrity culture, The Naked Truth, is a well-acted British comedy that doesn't quite succeed in melding its black and broad comedy". The Radio Times reviewer wrote: "This black comedy supplied Peter Sellers with some of his funniest, and finest, pre-Hollywood material. It's based - as the best British humour often is - on class and sex...Mario Zampi directs the gags in Michael Pertwee's satisfying script with superb timing." Leonard Maltin observed: "Sellers (cast as a television star) is a special treat in this amusing satire."

References

External links
 
 

1957 comedy films
1957 films
British black-and-white films
British comedy films
Films directed by Mario Zampi
Films shot at Pinewood Studios
Films set in London
Films set in England
Films set in Ireland
1950s English-language films
1950s British films